Isaac Lawrence Purcell (born July 17, 1857) was a renowned lawyer in the United States. Booker T. Washington noted he was admitted to the bar of the United States Supreme Court and had cases before it. He worked in Jacksonville, Florida.

He was born in Winnsboro, South Carolina. His father John W. Purcell was a carpenter. He studied at the University of South Carolina after it was desegregated but was excluded after segregation was restored and studied the law privately in Palatka, Florida. He was an active Republican and attended party conventions.

He and attorney J. Douglas Wetmore challenged the law segregating streetcars in Florida as unconstitutional. The Avery Law was invalidated. It was one of the only wins against segregation laws during the Jim Crow era and attempts to expand its reach were not successful as the same court ruled that there was equality in other instances of segregation where blacks served blacks and white served whites. He represented the Union Aid Association of America.

Wetmore moved to New York City in the wake of the trials and eventually committed suicide.

References

People from Winnsboro, South Carolina
1857 births
Year of death missing
Florida lawyers
University of South Carolina alumni
People from Jacksonville, Florida
Florida Republicans
19th-century American lawyers
African-American lawyers
American civil rights lawyers
Suicides in New York City
Lawyers from New York City